Bournvita is a brand of malted and chocolate malt drink mixes manufactured by Cadbury, a subsidiary of Mondelez International. It is sold in the United Kingdom and North America, as well as India, Nepal, Bangladesh, Nigeria, Benin, and Togo. Bournvita was developed in England in the late 1920s and was marketed as a health food. The original recipe included full-cream milk, fresh eggs, malt, edible rennet casein and chocolate.  It was first manufactured and sold in Australia in 1933. Bournvita was discontinued in the UK market in 2008. The drink was named by Cadbury which was derived from Bournville, the model village which is the site of the Cadbury factory (Bourn + Vita). It was first sold in India in 1948, the same year Cadbury India was established.

See also

 List of chocolate drinks

Notes

References

External links
Cadbury Bournvita on Facebook
Product web page at Cadbury India

Chocolate drinks
Drink brands
Cadbury brands
Mondelez International brands